South Sudan competed in the Olympic Games for the first time at the 2016 Summer Olympics in Rio de Janeiro. The South Sudan National Olympic Committee (NOC) was admitted by the International Olympic Committee (IOC) at the 128th IOC Session on 2 August 2015.

History 
South Sudan was part of Sudan until 2011, when it gained independence after a referendum. Sudan has competed at the Olympics since 1960. Under IOC rules, the South Sudan NOC was not eligible for IOC membership until national sports federations had joined both the NOC and the corresponding international federation of five Olympic sports. Guor Marial competed as an Independent Olympic Athlete at the 2012 Summer Olympics, finishing 47th in the men's marathon.  Margret Rumat Rumar Hassan competed as an Independent Olympic Athlete at the 2014 Summer Youth Olympics. By 2015, Sudanese federations were recognised in athletics, basketball, association football, handball, judo, table tennis and taekwondo. The South Sudan NOC was founded by representatives of these sports on 8 June 2015. After a recommendation by its executive board, the IOC admitted the NOC at its session in Kuala Lumpur by acclamation.

2016 South Sudanese Refugee Athletes
Over twenty athletes from South Sudan trained in Kenya for participation in the Rio 2016 Games under Olympic flag refugee status. The Tegla Loroupe Peace Foundation provided training facilities in partnership with the International Olympic Committee and UN HCR and negotiations are underway to regularize participation by the South Sudanese government. Ultimately, a total of five South Sudanese athletes were selected to compete as part of the Refugee Olympic Team at the 2016 Summer Olympics, alongside five other refugee athletes from other counties.

Medal tables by Games

Medals by Summer Games

Flagbearers

References

External links